Sheth Gopalji Hemraj High School  is located in Borivali (East), Mumbai, India. It was established in 1933 and managed by Borivali Education Societies. The high school offers teaching in three languages - Gujarati, English and Marathi.

This is one of the oldest schools in Mumbai.

History
The school is said to be inaugurated by The Father of the Nation. The old building of the school towards the southern part was a marvelous piece of architecture, it was a stone building of colonial times - 1935. But due to the trustee's decision it was demolished in 2002 in the name of a shopping complex and concrete construction of an old building. Before this demolishment there were four school buildings:
  Kindergarten
  Main building for the Gujarati and Marathi medium schools.
  English medium school building
  Administrative office building.

But now the school building has been reduced to one concrete building.

Location
This school is located at one of the prosperous Western Suburban of Mumbai called Borivali. It is at five minutes walkable distance from the railway station in the east zone. The school has an adjacent State Transport Bus Depot known as Sukurwadi. Sanjay Gandhi National Park one of the tourist attraction in Mumbai is at a walkable distance from the school.

Architecture
The school has a Rented building. It has got 30 classrooms for instructional purposes. It has 2 other rooms for non-teaching activities. The school has a separate room for Head Master/Teacher. The school has a Pucca boundary wall. The school has had an electric connection. The source of Drinking Water in the school is Tap Water and it is functional. The school has 30 boys' toilets and it is functional. and 30 girls toilet and it is functional. The school has a playground. The school has a library and has 1065 books in its library. The school has 6 Lift. The school does not need a ramp for disabled children to access classrooms. The school has 25 computers for teaching and learning purposes and all are functional. The school is all having a computer-aided Learning Lab.

References

External links
page at Wikimapia

Borivali
High schools and secondary schools in Mumbai